Pompeya may refer to:

Pompeii, a Roman town near Naples, Italy
Pompeya (band), a Russian band
Nueva Pompeya, a neighborhood of Buenos Aires, Argentina